Holy Trinity Church, Shanghai, is a Protestant (and formerly Anglican) church in Huangpu District of Shanghai.

The church, consecrated in 1869 was designed in a Gothic Revival style by British architect Sir George Gilbert Scott. After 1875, upon the appointment of Bishop William Russell as the first Church of England Bishop in the Diocese of North China, the church was commonly referred to as a cathedral, and the senior priest was known as the Dean. This cathedral designation was however mainly by way of common convention than fact as the titular bishop of the Anglican Communion located in Shanghai at the time was Channing Moore Williams of the Episcopal Church.

The church has recently been restored and since 2006 has served as the main church and headquarters of the Three-Self Patriotic Movement in Shanghai. However, as at June 2018 the church was still not open for worship. The bookshop in the former school was open.

History

Prior to the construction and dedication of Holy Trinity in 1847, church services attended by the British community were held in the British Consulate. Thomas Chaye Beale of Dent & Co. purchased and donated the current site of Holy Trinity as a gift to the church. The first church structure on the site was of poor quality; the roof collapsing, following intense rainfall, on 24 June 1850.

The neo-Gothic design of the current church by Sir George Gilbert Scott, was modified by William Kidner, a junior architect in Scott's office due to budget constraints and in an effort to accommodate a growing congregation. The foundation stone was laid in 1866 and the church was eventually dedicated in 1869. The laying of the foundation stone was a grand public event. A procession for the event starting from the nearby Masonic Hall heading to the cathedral site, and the laying of the stone
was a full Masonic ceremony under the direction and superintendence of the Provincial Grand Lodge of China. A spire was added to the original tower in 1901 although this was later removed during the Cultural Revolution. Holy Trinity faces Jerusalem, which is roughly in the west. When introduced in 1914, the church had the largest organ in Asia an instrument supplied by J. W. Walker & Sons Ltd of London.

Before the forced amalgamation of Anglican denominations in mainland China into the lianghui in 1958, the church served as the cathedral of the Anglican Church in China, known as Holy Trinity Cathedral, and the oldest such cathedral in China. It was colloquially known as "the Red Church". It was the English speaking Anglican church of Shanghai in 1866-1949. It also had a boys' school attached, built in 1928. This was attended by the author JG Ballard in his youth, and it features in his novel, Empire of the Sun. The 1st Shanghai Baden-Powell Group was based there. Later, it became the cathedral of the Diocese of Chekiang in 1930, still an English speaking church.

Location
Its address is 219, Jiujiang Road. The nearest station on the Shanghai Metro is Nanjing Rd East Station. It has a separate carillon.

Renovations
Its spire was destroyed during the cultural revolution and has since been restored. During the Cultural Revolution, it was confiscated by the Huangpu District authorities and converted into a cinema. A stage was installed in the chancel, a second floor and sloping floor were introduced and the brickwork was covered by plaster and painted. Peter Hibbard, who described it as "a central feature of British life in a faraway land," was consulted in its restoration. The restoration was carried out by Zhang Ming Architectural Design Firm. Carved teak pews were provided by a furniture factory in Zhejiang province. The church was reopened in December 2017.

Current use
It now serves as the headquarters of the Three-Self Patriotic Movement, having been used for police offices and the exit visa bureau. The church complex was handed back to the lianghui in 2006.

Marriages
Alfred Brooke-Smith
William Cassels
William Herbert Vacher
Hiram Parkes Wilkinson
Louie Yim-qun
Henry Jackson Yue
Margaret Williamson King

References

Former Anglican churches in China
Churches completed in 1869
Churches in Shanghai
Culture in Shanghai
Tourist attractions in Shanghai
Landmarks in Shanghai
Anglican cathedrals in China
George Gilbert Scott buildings
Gothic Revival church buildings in China
Cathedrals in Shanghai
1869 establishments in China
Three-Self Patriotic Movement
19th-century Anglican church buildings
19th-century churches in China
Christianity and Freemasonry
Freemasonry in China